The 2021 EchoPark Texas Grand Prix was a NASCAR Cup Series race that was held on May 23, 2021, at Circuit of the Americas in Austin, Texas. Originally scheduled for 68 laps on the 3.426-mile (5.514 km) road course, the race was shortened to 54 laps by heavy rain. It was the 14th race of the 2021 NASCAR Cup Series season.

Report

Background

Circuit of the Americas (COTA) is a grade 1 FIA-specification motorsports facility located within the extraterritorial jurisdiction of Austin, Texas. It features a  road racing circuit.  The facility is home to the Formula One United States Grand Prix, and the Motorcycle Grand Prix of the Americas, a round of the FIM Road Racing World Championship. It previously hosted the Supercars Championship, the FIA World Endurance Championship, the IMSA SportsCar Championship, and IndyCar Series.

On September 30, 2020, it was announced that COTA would host a NASCAR Cup Series event for the first time on May 23, 2021. The lower Xfinity and Camping World Truck Series were also added as support events. On December 11, 2020, it was announced that NASCAR would run the full 3.41 mile course.

British IMSA driver Kyle Tilley made his NASCAR debut, replacing B. J. McLeod for Live Fast Motorsports.

Entry list
 (R) denotes rookie driver.
 (i) denotes driver who are ineligible for series driver points.

Practice

Practice results

Qualifying

NASCAR also implemented a new rule for qualifying.  For road course qualifying, a timing loop marked on the circuit, not the start-finish line, will set official time.  The rule is similar to that used by INDYCAR, which also uses knockout qualifying.  At this circuit, the exit of Istanbul 8 will be used as the timing line.

Qualifying results

Race

Tyler Reddick won his first career pole in qualifying. It began to rain on the first lap and all drivers pitted to change from slick tires to treaded rain tires. Kevin Harvick got heavy damage after making contact with Ryan Blaney, which also collected Christopher Bell and Bubba Wallace. Joey Logano won the first stage. In the second stage, the rain picked up, and the ensuing spray created visibility issues. In one incident, Martin Truex Jr. got into the back of Michael McDowell and then was rammed into by Cole Custer, severely damaging both cars, and causing Custer's car to catch on fire. Kyle Busch won the second stage. On a round of green flag pit stops, Kyle Larson passed Busch for the lead. Alex Bowman took the lead from Larson and was then passed by Chase Elliott. The race was red flagged again due to heavier rain and was called official with 14 laps to go. Elliott was awarded the win, giving Chevrolet its 800th win in NASCAR and Hendrick Motorsports its 268th win, tying Petty Enterprises for the most wins by team in NASCAR history.

Stage Results

Stage One
Laps: 15

Stage Two
Laps: 17

Final Stage Results

Stage Three
Laps: 36

Race statistics
 Lead changes: 11 among 10 different drivers
 Cautions/Laps: 6 for 41
 Red flags: 2 (1 for weather, 1 for 20 minutes and 54 seconds)
 Time of race: 3 hours, 7 minutes and 11 seconds
 Average speed:

Media

Television
Fox Sports covered the race on the television side. Mike Joy, Jeff Gordon and Clint Bowyer called the race from the broadcast booth. Jamie Little and Regan Smith handled pit road for the television side. Larry McReynolds provided insight from the Fox Sports studio in Charlotte.

Radio
PRN had the radio call for the race which was simulcasted on Sirius XM NASCAR Radio.

Standings after the race

Drivers' Championship standings

Manufacturers' Championship standings

Note: Only the first 16 positions are included for the driver standings.
. – Driver has clinched a position in the NASCAR Cup Series playoffs.

References

Texas Grand Prix
Circuit of the Americas
Texas Grand Prix
NASCAR races at Circuit of the Americas
Texas Grand Prix